Pae Gil-su (also written Pae Kil-su, born March 4, 1972) is a North Korean gymnast.

He won the gold medal for the pommel horse at the 1992 Summer Olympics (tied with Vitaly Scherbo).

And he won the gold medal at the 27th, 28th and 32nd World Gymnastics Championships.

Pae attended Pyongyang Sinri Primary School and the Korean Physical Education College.

References

External links
 
 Pae Gil Su at gymn-forum.net
 
 
 

1972 births
Living people
North Korean male artistic gymnasts
Olympic gymnasts of North Korea
Gymnasts at the 1992 Summer Olympics
Gymnasts at the 1996 Summer Olympics
Gymnasts at the 2000 Summer Olympics
Olympic gold medalists for North Korea
World champion gymnasts
Medalists at the World Artistic Gymnastics Championships
Olympic medalists in gymnastics
Medalists at the 1992 Summer Olympics
Asian Games medalists in gymnastics
Gymnasts at the 1990 Asian Games
Gymnasts at the 1998 Asian Games
Sportspeople from Pyongyang
People's Athletes
Asian Games gold medalists for North Korea
Asian Games bronze medalists for North Korea
Medalists at the 1990 Asian Games
Medalists at the 1998 Asian Games